This article refers to the reggae album. For music history, see History of music. For the 2005 box set by The Band, see A Musical History.
Musical History is a reggae album by Prince Far I released in the year of his death in 1983.

Track listing
"Everytime I Talk About Jah"            
"Prince Far I Come Again"              
"Tell Them About Jah Love"             
"More We Are Together"                  
"At The Cross"
"Working For My Saviour"
"I Don't Know Why I Love Jah So"
"What You Gonna Do On Judgement Day"
"Take Heed Frontline"

1983 albums
Prince Far I albums